Lawrence Brooks (September 12, 1909 – January 5, 2022) was an American veteran of the United States Army and was once the oldest living man in the United States. A supercentenarian from New Orleans, Louisiana. As of January 5, 2022 he was the oldest known living American World War II veteran as well as one of the first living humans worldwide born in the early 20th century.

Early life
Brooks was born on September 12, 1909. He grew up in Norwood, Louisiana, and had 14 siblings. When he was an infant, the family moved to several cities closer to the Mississippi Delta, but he was raised primarily in the small town of Stephenson. He lived too far away from a school to attend one, so he was instead taught at home.

Military service
Brooks was drafted into the army in 1940, when he was 31. At the time, he was employed at a sawmill. He was discharged in 1941, after a year of mandatory service, but he rejoined the army after the attack on Pearl Harbor. He served in the 91st Engineer Battalion in the United States Army in New Guinea and the Philippines during World War II. Brooks was a soldier in the Pacific Theatre from 1941 to 1945. He reached the rank of private first class.

Brooks's unit, an engineering corps, was tasked mainly with building infrastructure. However, the army was segregated during his service, and he was responsible for assisting white officers with daily tasks.

During a posting in Australia, Brooks noted that he was treated better by the white people there than in the United States in the decades prior to the civil rights movement.

Later life
After his military service, Brooks worked as a forklift operator in New Orleans until his retirement, and he had five children. His wife, Leona, died shortly after Hurricane Katrina. In the mid-2010s, The National WWII Museum began to host an annual birthday party for Brooks. In 2020, this celebration included a flyover of World War II aircraft above Brooks's house, with the museum's "Victory Belles", a trio of singers performing songs predominantly from the 1940s era. The city of New Orleans also recognized Brooks's birthday with an official proclamation.

Death 
Brooks died on January 5, 2022, in his New Orleans home, at the age of 112 years, 115 days. His daughter, Vanessa Brooks, confirmed his death to magazine Military Times hours later. She said that he had been back and forth to the New Orleans VA Hospital in recent months. After his death, actor Gary Sinise posted a tribute on Twitter. Louisiana governor John Bel Edwards also posted, saying: "I am sorry to hear of the passing of Mr. Lawrence Brooks, America’s oldest World War II veteran and a proud Louisianan". President Joe Biden referred to Brooks as "truly the best of America".

References

External links 
  (video, 0:55 seconds)

1909 births
2022 deaths
African Americans in World War II
American supercentenarians
African-American centenarians
Men supercentenarians
United States Army personnel of World War II
United States Army soldiers
21st-century African-American people
People from East Feliciana Parish, Louisiana
Military personnel from Louisiana
African-American United States Army personnel